Flores is a canton in the Heredia province of Costa Rica. The head city is in San Joaquín district.

History 
Flores was created on 12 August 1915 by decree 52.

Geography 
Flores has an area of  km² and a mean elevation of  metres.

The compact canton is located between the provincial capital cities of Alajuela and Heredia, with the Segundo River forming the northwestern boundary and the Burío River establishing the canton's southwestern border.

Districts 
The canton of Flores is subdivided into the following districts:
 San Joaquín
 Barrantes
 Llorente

Demographics 

For the 2011 census, Flores had a population of  inhabitants.

Transportation

Road transportation 
The canton is covered by the following road routes:

Rail transportation 
The Interurbano Line operated by Incofer goes through this canton.

References 

Cantons of Heredia Province
Populated places in Heredia Province